

Nemaxera is a genus of the fungus moth family, Tineidae. Therein, it belongs to the subfamily Nemapogoninae. The genus is considered monotypic, with the single species Nemaxera betulinella placed here.

The species occurs in western Eurasia east of France; it is also found in Great Britain but appears to be absent from the Balkans. Its caterpillars feed mainly on fungi, namely birch polypore (Fomitopsis betulina) and turkey tail (Trametes versicolor). To a lesser extent, they eat rotting wood.

Junior synonyms of N. betulinella are:
 Nemaxera emortuella (Zeller, 1839)
 Tinea betulinella Paykull, 1785
 Tinea concinnella Hübner, [1836]
 Tinea corticella Curtis, 1834 (non Linnaeus, 1758: preoccupied)
 Tinea emortuella Zeller, 1839 – type of genus Nemaxera

Footnotes

References

  (2009): Nemaxera. Version 2.1, 22 December 2009. Retrieved 5 May 2010.
  (1942): Eigenartige Geschmacksrichtungen bei Kleinschmetterlingsraupen ["Strange tastes among micromoth caterpillars"]. Zeitschrift des Wiener Entomologen-Vereins 27: 105-109 [in German]. PDF fulltext
  (2004): Butterflies and Moths of the World, Generic Names and their Type-species – Nemaxera. Version of 5 November 2004. Retrieved 5 May 2010.
  [2010]: Global Taxonomic Database of Tineidae (Lepidoptera). Retrieved 5 May 2010.
  (2001): Markku Savela's Lepidoptera and some other life forms – Nemaxera. Version of 4 November 2001. Retrieved 5 May 2010.

Nemapogoninae
Moths of Europe
Moths of Asia